The voiceless alveolo-palatal sibilant fricative is a type of consonantal sound, used in some spoken languages.

In British Received Pronunciation,  after syllable-initial  (as in Tuesday) is realized as a devoiced palatal fricative. The amount of devoicing is variable, but the fully voiceless variant tends to be alveolo-palatal  in the  sequence: . It is a fricative, rather than a fricative element of an affricate because the preceding plosive remains alveolar, rather than becoming alveolo-palatal, as in Dutch.

An increasing number of British speakers merge this sequence with the voiceless palato-alveolar affricate :  (see yod-coalescence), mirroring Cockney, Australian English and New Zealand English. On the other hand, there is an opposite tendency in Canadian accents that have preserved , where the sequence tends to merge with the plain  instead:  (see yod-dropping), mirroring General American which does not allow  to follow alveolar consonants in stressed syllables.

Features

Features of the voiceless alveolo-palatal fricative:

Occurrence

See also
 Index of phonetics articles
Voiceless palato-alveolar sibilant

References

Sources

External links
 

Fricative consonants
Alveolo-palatal consonants
Pulmonic consonants
Co-articulated consonants
Voiceless oral consonants
Central consonants